"Hail to California" is an alma mater song used throughout the University of California system. It is traditionally played before every basketball home game, is a common song at California Golden Bears football games and is sung at convocations and matriculations at UCSB and UC Davis.

Lyrics

References
Cal Band's web page on the song
Information from DavisWiki
UCSB pep band page

American college songs
Alma mater songs
1907 songs